Victor Augagneur (16 May 1855 – 23 April 1931) was a French politician. 

Augagneur was born in Lyon. He was the mayor of Lyon from 1900 to 1905, and represented the Independent Socialists in the Chamber of Deputies from 1904 to 1905. He was Governor of Madagascar from 1905 to 1910.

He served once again in the Chamber of Deputies, representing the Republican-Socialist Party from 1910 to 1919. He was Minister of Public Works, Posts and Telegraphs under Prime Minister Joseph Caillaux from 1911 to 1912, then (under Prime Minister Rene Viviani) Minister of National Education in 1914 and Naval Minister from 1914 to 1915. 

He was Governor of French Equatorial Africa from 1920 to 1923, then returned once again to the Chamber of Deputies from 1928 to 1931, representing the Independent Radicals.

References

1855 births
1931 deaths
Republican-Socialist Party politicians
Independent Radical politicians
French Ministers of Public Works, Posts and Telegraphs
Members of the 8th Chamber of Deputies of the French Third Republic
Members of the 10th Chamber of Deputies of the French Third Republic
Members of the 11th Chamber of Deputies of the French Third Republic
Members of the 14th Chamber of Deputies of the French Third Republic
Mayors of Lyon
French people of World War I